The Remington–Keene is an early bolt-action rifle with a tubular magazine.

Remington manufactured prototypes of Keene's patents for consideration by the United States Army Ordnance Department Magazine Gun Board convened in 1878. Although the Army rejected the design in favor of the Winchester-Hotchkiss, Remington commenced production and offered the rifle to the United States Navy Bureau of Ordnance. The Navy purchased 250 rifles for comparison with their 2,500 Hotchkiss rifles and 300 M1885 Remington-Lee rifles. The Remington–Keene rifles were delivered in 1880 with US and an anchor stamped on the left side of the barrel and WWK and P (proof) stamped on the right side of the barrel by Lieutenant William W. Kimball. In July 1880 the United States Department of the Interior purchased 600 Frontier Model carbines with  barrels to arm the Indian Police on a number of reservations in the western United States. Rifles were manufactured for civilian sales chambered for .45-70, .40-60 Winchester, and .43 Spanish.

Notes

External links
 The 1878 Remington-Keene: Tube Fed .45-70 Bolt Action Rifle

Remington Arms firearms
Bolt-action rifles of the United States